The 1999 World Men's Handball Championship was the 16th edition of the World Championship in team handball. It was held in Egypt, from 1 to 15 June, in the cities of Cairo, Ismailia and Port Said. Sweden won the championship.

Qualification

Preliminary round
All times are local (UTC+3).

Group A

Group B

Group C

Group D

Final round

Bracket

Fifth place bracket

Round of 16

Quarterfinals

5–8th place semifinals

Semifinals

Seventh place game

Fifth place game

Bronze medal game

Final

Ranking and statistics

Final standings

All-star Team

 Best player: 
 Goalkeeper: 
 Left wing: 
 Left back: 
 Center back: 
 Pivot : 
 Right back: 
 Right wing:

Top goalscorers

Source: Egypt99

Top goalkeepers

Medalists

References

External links
Tournament page from the IHF
XVI Men's World Championship at IHF.info

World Handball Championship tournaments
W
H
H
June 1999 sports events in Africa
Sports competitions in Cairo
Sport in Port Said